Archestratus was a 4th-century BC gastronomic poet.

Archestratus may also refer to:
 Archestratus, the author of a work Περὶ Αὺλητῶν ("On the Unthinkable"), seems to be a different person from the poet mentioned above
 Archestratus (music theorist), 3rd century BC harmonic theorist
 Archestratus of Phrearrhi, Plato's neighbor
 Archestratus (general), Athenian commander at the Battle of Potidaea, 432 BC
 Archestratus (boule), member of the Athenian boule in the 5th century BCE; likely distinct from the Archestratus above
 Archestratus, banker who did business in 4th century BC Athens, owner of the slave Pasion